Minuscule 901 (in the Gregory-Aland numbering), δ 162 (von Soden), is an 11th-century Greek minuscule manuscript of the New Testament on parchment. It has marginalia. The manuscript has survived in its complete form.

Description 

The codex contains the text of the New Testament (without Book of Apocalypse), on 328 parchment leaves (size ), with some lacunae. The text is written in one column per page, 31 lines per page.
It contains also liturgical books with hagiographies: Synaxarion and Menologion.

The order of books: Gospels, Acts of the Apostles, Catholic epistles, and Pauline epistles.

It has errors of Iota subscriptum.

It has so called Jerusalem Colophon.

Text 
The Greek text of the codex is a representative of the Byzantine. Hermann von Soden classified it to the textual family Iφβ. Kurt Aland placed it in Category V.

According to the Claremont Profile Method it represents the textual family Kx in Luke 1 and Luke 20. In Luke 10 no profile was made. It was corrected to Family Π in Luke 20.

History 

According to F. H. A. Scrivener it was written in the 12th-century, according to C. R. Gregory it was written in the 11th-century. Currently the manuscript is dated by the INTF to the 11th-century. It once belonged to Jakob Jonas Björnståhl (1731-1779), professor from Lund University, who bequeathed it for the University of Uppsala. In 1784 it was acquired for the library of the University of Uppsala as "Björnståhl 2" along with 902 and 1852. Gregory saw it in 1891.

The manuscript was added to the list of New Testament manuscripts by Scrivener (615e) and Gregory (901e).

It is not cited in critical editions of the Greek New Testament (UBS4, NA28).

The manuscript is housed at the Uppsala University (Gr. 12) in Uppsala.

See also 

 List of New Testament minuscules (1–1000)
 Biblical manuscript
 Textual criticism

References

Further reading

External links 
 

Greek New Testament minuscules
11th-century biblical manuscripts